Piye (once transliterated as Pankhy or Piankhi; d. 714 BC) was an ancient Kushite king and founder of the Twenty-fifth Dynasty of Egypt, who ruled Egypt from 744–714 BC. He ruled from the city of Napata, located deep in Nubia, modern-day Sudan.

Name
Piye adopted two throne names: Usimare and Sneferre. He was passionate about the worship of the god Amun, like many kings of Nubia. He revitalized the moribund Great Temple of Amun at Jebel Barkal, which was first built under Thutmose III of the New Kingdom, employing numerous sculptors and stonemasons from Egypt. He was once thought to have also used the throne name 'Menkheperre' ("the Manifestation of Ra abides") but this prenomen has now been recognized as belonging to a local Theban king named Ini instead who was a contemporary of Piye.

Family

Piye was the son of Kashta and Pebatjma. He is known to have had three or four wives. Abar was the mother of his successor Taharqa. Further wives are Tabiry, Peksater and probably Khensa.

Piye is known to have had several children. He was the father of:
 King Shebitku. Said to be a son of Piye, or alternatively a brother of Piye.
 King Taharqa. Son of Queen Abar. He would take the throne after his uncle Shabaka and another male relative Shebitku.
 God's Wife of Amun Shepenwepet II. Installed in Thebes during the reign of her brother Taharqa.
 Qalhata, wife of King Shabaka, she was the mother of king Tanutamun and probably of King Shabataka as well.
 Tabekenamun married her brother Taharqa.
 Naparaye married her brother Taharqa.
 Takahatenamun married her brother Taharqa.
 Arty, married king Shebitku.
 Har. Known from an offering table of his daughter Wadjrenes from Thebes (TT34).
 Khaliut, Governor of Kanad according to a stela found at Barkal.
 Princess Mutirdis, Chief Prophet of Hathor and Mut in Thebes and daughter of Piye according to Morkot. Thought to be a daughter of a local ruler named Menkheperre Khmuny from Hermopolis by Kitchen.

Conquest of Egypt

As ruler of Nubia and Upper Egypt, Piye took advantage of the squabbling of Egypt's rulers by expanding Nubia's power beyond Thebes into Lower Egypt. In reaction to this, Tefnakht of Sais formed a coalition between the local kings of the Delta Region and enticed Piye's nominal ally—king Nimlot of Hermopolis—to defect to his side. Tefnakht then sent his coalition army south and besieged Herakleopolis where its king Peftjauawybast and the local Nubian commanders appealed to Piye for help. Piye reacted quickly to this crisis in his regnal year 20 by assembling an army to invade Middle and Lower Egypt and visited Thebes in time for the great Opet Festival which proves he effectively controlled Upper Egypt by this time. His military feats are chronicled in the Victory stela at Gebel Barkal:

Piye viewed his campaign as a Holy War, commanding his soldiers to cleanse themselves ritually before beginning battle. He himself offered sacrifices to the great god Amun.

Piye then marched north and achieved complete victory at Herakleopolis, conquering the cities of Hermopolis and Memphis among others, and received the submission of the kings of the Nile Delta including Iuput II of Leontopolis, Osorkon IV of Tanis and his former ally Nimlot at Hermopolis. Hermopolis fell to the Nubian king after a siege lasting five months. Tefnakht took refuge in an island in the Delta and formally conceded defeat in a letter to the Nubian king but refused to personally pay homage to the Kushite ruler. Satisfied with his triumph, Piye proceeded to sail south to Thebes and returned to his homeland in Nubia never to return to Egypt.

Despite Piye's successful campaign into the Delta, his authority only extended northward from Thebes up to the western desert oases and Herakleopolis where Peftjauawybast ruled as a Nubian vassal king. The local kings of Lower Egypt—especially Tefnakht—were essentially free to do what they wanted without Piye's oversight. It was Shebitku, Piye's successor, who later rectified this unsatisfactory situation by attacking Sais and defeating Tefnakht's successor Bakenranef there, in his second regnal year.

Length of reign 

Piye's highest known date was long thought to be the "Year 24 III Akhet day 10" date mentioned in the "Smaller Dakhla Stela" (Ashmolean Museum No.1894) from the Sutekh temple of Mut el-Kharab in the Dakhla Oasis. However, reliefs from the Great Temple at Gebel Barkal depict Piye celebrating a Heb Sed Festival. Such festivals were traditionally celebrated in a king's 30th Year. It is debated whether the reliefs portrayed historical events, or were prepared in advance for the festival—in which case Piye might have died before his 30th regnal year. Piye is also attested by two papyri dated to Year 21 and 22 of his reign where he is named  Pharaoh "Piye Si-Ese Meryamun" which is undoubtedly this king's name. 

Kenneth Kitchen has suggested a reign of 31 years for Piye, based on the Year 8 donation stela of a king Shepsesre Tefnakht who is commonly viewed as Piye's opponent. A dissenting opinion came from Olivier Perdu in 2002, who believes that this stela refers instead to the later king Tefnakht II because of stylistic similarities to another, dated to Year 2 of Necho I's reign. Secondly, Kitchen observes that:

Burial

Piye's tomb was located next to the largest Pyramid in the cemetery, designated Ku.1 (seen in the image on the right), at el-Kurru near Jebel Barkal in what is now Northern Sudan. Down a stairway of 19 steps opened to the east, the burial chamber is cut into the bedrock as an open trench and covered with a corbelled masonry roof. His body had been placed on a bed which rested in the middle of the chamber on a stone bench with its four corners cut away to receive the legs of the bed so that the bed platform lay directly on the bench. Further out to the edge of the cemetery (the first pharaoh to receive such an entombment in more than 500 years) his four favorite horses had been buried. This site would be also occupied by the tombs of several later members of the dynasty.

Stele of Piye
Following its discovery in Jebel Barkal, the Stele of Piye was published by Auguste Mariette in 1872. It consists of a front, a reverse, a two thick sides, all covered with text. Emmanuel de Rougé published a complete word-by-word translation in French in 1876.

References

Bibliography
 Roberto B. Gozzoli: The Writing of History in Ancient Egypt during the First Millennium BC (ca. 1070-180 BC), Trends and Perspectives, London 2006, S. 54-67

External links

 The Victory Stela of Piankhy
 The Stela of Piye - verbatim translation  

710s BC deaths
8th-century BC Pharaohs
8th-century BC monarchs of Kush
Kingdom of Kush
Pharaohs of the Twenty-fifth Dynasty of Egypt
Egyptian people of Nubian descent
Year of birth unknown
Year of death uncertain